European Snooker Championship may refer to:

 EBSA European Snooker Championship, premier amateur snooker tournament
 European Masters (snooker), professional ranking snooker tournament